A dominion was a self-governing autonomous state within the British Empire.

Dominion may also refer to:

Businesses and brands
 Dominion (supermarket), in Canada
 Dominion Diamond Mines, in Canada
 Dominion Energy or Dominion, a utility in Virginia
 Dominion Enterprises, a creator and distributor of free periodicals
 Dominion Network, a Canadian radio network
 Dominion Stores (Newfoundland), a supermarket chain in Canada
 Dominion Theatre, in London, England
 Dominion Voting Systems, a Canadian-American company that sells electronic voting systems
 Dominion of Canada General Insurance Company (The Dominion), a defunct insurance company in Canada
 The Dominion Bank, a defunct bank in Canada

Entertainment

Film
Jurassic World Dominion, a 2022 science fiction film
Dominion (documentary), a 2018 documentary about animal agriculture and animal rights
Dominion (2016 film), a biographical film about poet Dylan Thomas
Dominion: Prequel to the Exorcist, a 2005 horror film

Music
 Dominion (British band), a British band from Thornhill, Dewsbury
 Dominion (Filipino band), a Goth rock band
 Dominion (Swedish band), a Swedish technical death metal band
 "Dominion" (song), a 1987 song by the Sisters of Mercy
 Dominion (Benedictum album), 2011
 Dominion (HammerFall album), 2019
 Dominion (Jakob EP), 2004
 Dominion (Kamelot album), 1997
 Dominion (Don McLean album), 1982
 Dominion (Tech N9ne album), 2017
 Dominion, 2022 album by Skillet

Games
 Dominion (card game), a card game by Donald X. Vaccarino 
 Dominion: Storm Over Gift 3, a 1998 real-time strategy computer game

Print media
 Dominion (poem), a 1938 poem by A. R. D. Fairburn
 Dominion (Sansom novel), an alternative history novel by C. J. Sansom 2012
 Dominion (Walters novel), a 1999 Doctor Who novel by Nick Walters
 Dominion: The Power of Man, the Suffering of Animals, and the Call to Mercy, a book about animal protection by Matthew Scully
 Dominators (DC Comics), an alien race collectively known as the Dominion in DC Comics
 Dominion (manga), a 1985–1986 manga by Masamune Shirow
 The Dominion (Canada), a monthly newspaper based in Montreal, Canada
 The Dominion (Wellington), a former newspaper in Wellington, New Zealand, now part of The Dominion Post
 Dominion: An Anthology of Speculative Fiction From Africa and the African Diaspora, 2020 American science fiction anthology

Television
 "Dominion" (Stargate SG-1), a 2007 episode of Stargate SG-1 from season 10
 Dominion (Star Trek), an interstellar empire in the Star Trek fictional universe
 Dominion (TV series), a 2014 TV series on the Syfy channel, based on the 2010 movie Legion

Places
 Dominion, Nova Scotia, Canada
 Dominion, Maryland, an unincorporated community in Queen Anne's County, Maryland, United States
 The Dominion (San Antonio), a neighborhood in San Antonio, Texas, United States

Other uses
 Dominion (angel), a type of angel
 Dominion (harness race), a race held at the Addington Raceway, Christchurch, New Zealand
 Dominion Institute, a former foundation promoting knowledge of Canadian heritage, now part of Historica Canada
 HMS Dominion, a battleship in the British Royal Navy from 1905 to 1918
 NJPW Dominion, a professional wrestling event
 LNER Class A4 4489 Dominion of Canada, a steam locomotive
 The Dominion (train), a transcontinental passenger train on the Canadian Pacific Railway

See also
 Commonwealth realm, contemporary term for former Dominions
 Dominionism, a certain kind of conservative Christian political activity
 Dominions of Sweden